Modality, in Protestant and Catholic Christian theology, is the structure and organization of the local or universal church.  In Catholic theology, the modality is the universal Catholic church. In Protestant theology, the modality is variously described as either the universal church (that is, all believers) or the local church.

By contrast, parachurch organizations are sodalities.  These include missionary organizations and Christian charities not linked to specific churches.  Some theologians consider denominations, schools of theology, and other multi-congregational sodalities.  Catholic sodalities include orders, monasteries and convents.

The modality versus sodality parachurch dispute
In some Christian circles, particularly among non-denominational evangelicals, there is conflict over whether parachurch, including Christian not-for-profit organizations are a biblical model for ministry.  A minority of pastors and theologians assert that only the modality is a valid model for ministry, and they typically equate modality with the local church structure.  Central to the dispute is whether the missionary travels of Paul the Apostle should be categorized as an expression of modality or sodality.

A practical consideration in the modality/sodality dispute is that certain Christian efforts, like translating the Bible into different languages, are difficult to organize and fund solely by local congregations in the absence of parachurch organizations. Ralph D. Winter of the US Center for World Mission has argued that modes of modality and sodality are both necessary and will be most effective if they are supportive of one another.

References 

 R. D. Winter: The Two Structures of God's Redemptive Mission

Types of Christian organization
Ecclesiology